Lars Schmidt Grael (born February 9, 1964 in São Paulo) is a Brazilian politician and former professional sailor, having won two Olympic bronze medals (in 1988 and 1996).

His brother, Torben Grael, is also a sailor. Together they won the 1983 Snipe World Championship.

Lars is also ten-time Brazilian and five-time South American champion for the Tornado class, in which he also won his medals, eight years apart, in the Seoul and Atlanta Summer Olympics, alongside Clinio Freitas and Henrique Pellicano, respectively.

In September 1998, he suffered a serious accident in Vitória, Espírito Santo, caused by the negligence of a boat driver that left the boat propeller uncovered, which amputated one of the athlete's legs. Grael then gradually began to take a role to promote the sport in politics.

External links
 

1964 births
Sportspeople from São Paulo
Brazilian amputees
Brazilian people of Danish descent
Brazilian people of Polish descent
Brazilian male sailors (sport)
Living people
Olympic bronze medalists for Brazil
Olympic medalists in sailing
Olympic sailors of Brazil
Sailors at the 1984 Summer Olympics – Tornado
Sailors at the 1988 Summer Olympics – Tornado
Sailors at the 1992 Summer Olympics – Tornado
Sailors at the 1996 Summer Olympics – Tornado
Snipe class world champions
Star class sailors
Medalists at the 1996 Summer Olympics
Medalists at the 1988 Summer Olympics
World champions in sailing for Brazil
Star class world champions
Lars Grael